A breakwater is a permanent structure constructed at a coastal area to protect against tides, currents, waves, and storm surges.  Part of a coastal management system, breakwaters are installed to minimize erosion, and to protect anchorages, helping isolate vessels within them from marine hazards such as prop washes and wind-driven waves. A breakwater, also known in some contexts as a jetty, may be connected to land or freestanding, and may contain a walkway or road for vehicle access.

On beaches where longshore drift threatens the erosion of beach material, smaller structures on the beach, usually perpendicular to the water's edge, may be installed. Their action on waves and current is intended to slow the longshore drift and discourage mobilisation of beach material. In this usage they are more usually referred to as groynes.

Purposes

Breakwaters reduce the intensity of wave action in inshore waters and thereby provide safe harbourage.

An anchorage is only safe if ships anchored there are protected from the force of powerful waves by some large structure which they can shelter behind. Natural harbours are formed by such barriers as headlands or reefs. Artificial harbours can be created with the help of breakwaters. Mobile harbours, such as the D-Day Mulberry harbours, were floated into position and acted as breakwaters. Some natural harbours, such as those in Plymouth Sound, Portland Harbour, and Cherbourg, have been enhanced or extended by breakwaters made of rock.

Types 
Types of breakwaters include vertical wall breakwater, mound breakwater and mound with superstructure or composite breakwater.

A breakwater structure is designed to absorb the energy of the waves that hit it, either by using mass (e.g. with caissons), or by using a revetment slope (e.g. with rock or concrete armour units).

In coastal engineering, a revetment is a land-backed structure whilst a breakwater is a sea-backed structure (i.e. water on both sides).

Rubble 
Rubble mound breakwaters use structural voids to dissipate the wave energy. Rubble mound breakwaters consist of piles of stones more or less sorted according to their unit weight: smaller stones for the core and larger stones as an armour layer protecting the core from wave attack. Rock or concrete armour units on the outside of the structure absorb most of the energy, while gravels or sands prevent the wave energy's continuing through the breakwater core. The slopes of the revetment are typically between 1:1 and 1:2, depending upon the materials used. In shallow water, revetment breakwaters are usually relatively inexpensive. As water depth increases, the material requirements—and hence costs—increase significantly.

Caisson 
Caisson breakwaters typically have vertical sides and are usually erected where it is desirable to berth one or more vessels on the inner face of the breakwater. They use the mass of the caisson and the fill within it to resist the overturning forces applied by waves hitting them. They are relatively expensive to construct in shallow water, but in deeper sites they can offer a significant saving over revetment breakwaters.

An additional rubble mound is sometimes placed in front of the vertical structure in order to absorb wave energy and thus reduce wave reflection and horizontal wave pressure on the vertical wall. Such a design provides additional protection on the sea side and a quay wall on the inner side of the breakwater, but it can enhance wave overtopping.

Wave absorbing caisson 
A similar but more sophisticated concept is a wave-absorbing caisson, including various types of perforation in the front wall.

Such structures have been used successfully in the offshore oil-industry, but also on coastal projects requiring rather low-crested structures (e.g. on an urban promenade where the sea view is an important aspect (e.g. Beirut and Monaco)).

Wave attenuator 
Wave attenuators consist of concrete elements placed horizontally one foot under the free surface, positioned along a line parallel to the coast. The row of four sea-facing and two land-facing slabs reflects offshore wave by the action of the volume of water located under it which, made to oscillate under the effect of the incident wave, creates waves in phase opposition to the incident wave downstream from the slabs.

Living Breakwaters Grant: Tottenville, New York 
Living Breakwaters is a $67 million strategy that aims to help a waterfront neighborhood called Tottenville, on the southwestern part of New York City, survive rising sea levels and storm surges caused by climate change. The strategy connects aquatic landscape architecture, science education, waste collection and coastal housing politics through the implementation of a 13,000 ft long breakwater with oysters planted along it. Each oyster planted is capable of filtering 50 gallons per day, removing all pollutants and toxins to create a cleaner harbor. The reproductive shimmy of the bivalves attracts many marine species, fostering significant ecosystem growth. Pete Malinowski, from the Billion Oyster Project, states that of the millions of oyster spawn that become babies, hardly any survive due to the lack of surfaces to settle on. Therefore, the implementation of reef will enhance the likelihood of oyster’s survival.  This concept of using oysters to fight climate change in coastal towns, “oyster-tecture”, was introduced in 2010 by landscape architect Kate Orff. Orff and her team created soft infrastructure made from fuzzy rope that allows for the seeding of oysters along points of the harbor. Living Breakwaters was awarded the Rebuild By Design grant in 2014 and was implemented by the New York State Governor’s Office of Storm Recovery. This grant additionally includes an on-shore building, the “water-hub, to host community activities near the breakwater. Simultaneously, NY Rising, the state’s civic rebuilding process, matched this federally funding initiative with the Tottenville Dune and Coastal Dune Plantings project The breakwaters will strengthen the vegetated dune system, providing protection to the beachside community in Tottenville by tempering beach erosion. Additionally, northern and eastern expansion of Living Breakwaters is expected along Staten Island at Lemon Creek and Great Kills. As a result, Living Breakwaters provides educational opportunities for Tottenville youth, and overall economic growth for the town.

Breakwater armour units

As design wave heights get larger, rubble mound breakwaters require larger armour units to resist the wave forces. These armour units can be formed of concrete or natural rock. The largest standard grading for rock armour units given in CIRIA 683 "The Rock Manual" is 10–15 tonnes. Larger gradings may be available, but the ultimate size is limited in practice by the natural fracture properties of locally available rock.

Shaped concrete armour units (such as Dolos, Xbloc, Tetrapod, etc.) can be provided in up to approximately 40 tonnes (e.g. Jorf Lasfar, Morocco), before they become vulnerable to damage under self weight, wave impact and thermal cracking of the complex shapes during casting/curing. Where the very largest armour units are required for the most exposed locations in very deep water, armour units are most often formed of concrete cubes, which have been used up to ~195 tonnes for the tip of the breakwater at Punta Langosteira near La Coruña, Spain.

Preliminary design of armour unit size is often undertaken using the Hudson Equation, Van der Meer and more recently Van Gent et al.; these methods are all described in CIRIA 683 "The Rock Manual" and the United States Army Corps of Engineers Coastal engineering manual (available for free online) and elsewhere. For detailed design the use of scaled physical hydraulic models remains the most reliable method for predicting real-life behavior of these complex structures.

Unintended consequences
Breakwaters are subject to damage and overtopping in severe storms. Some may also have the effect of creating unique types of  waves that attract surfers, such as The Wedge at the Newport breakwater.

Sediment effects 
The dissipation of energy and relative calm water created in the lee of the breakwaters often encourage accretion of sediment (as per the design of the breakwater scheme). However, this can lead to excessive salient build up, resulting in tombolo formation, which reduces longshore drift shoreward of the breakwaters. This trapping of sediment can cause adverse effects down-drift of the breakwaters, leading to beach sediment starvation and increased coastal erosion. This may then lead to further engineering protection being needed down-drift of the breakwater development. Sediment accumulation in the areas surrounding breakwaters can cause flat areas with reduced depths, which changes the topographic landscape of the seabed.

Salient formations as a result of breakwaters are a function of the distance the breakwaters are built from the coast, the direction at which the wave hits the breakwater, and the angle at which the breakwater is built (relative to the coast). Of these three, the angle at which the breakwater is built is most important in the engineered formation of salients. The angle at which the breakwater is built determines the new direction of the waves (after they've hit the breakwaters), and in turn the direction that sediment will flow and accumulate over time.

Environmental effects 
The reduced heterogeneity in sea floor landscape introduced by breakwaters can lead to reduced species abundance and diversity in the surrounding ecosystems. As a result of the reduced heterogeneity and decreased depths that breakwaters produce due to sediment build up, the UV exposure and temperature in surrounding waters increase, which may disrupt surrounding ecosystems. 

But as a kind of environmental friendly breakwater, pile breakwaters because of occupation of a small area is not harmful to sea wildlife.

Construction of detached breakwaters
There are two main types of offshore breakwater (also called detached breakwater): single and multiple. The length of the gap is largely governed by the interacting wavelengths. Breakwaters may be either fixed or floating, and impermeable or permeable to allow sediment transfer shoreward of the structures, the choice depending on tidal range and water depth. They usually consist of large pieces of rock (granite) weighing up to 10–15 tonnes each, or rubble-mound. Their design is influenced by the angle of wave approach and other environmental parameters. Breakwater construction can be either parallel or perpendicular to the coast, depending on the shoreline requirements.

Notable locations
UK – The Sound, Plymouth; Sea Palling, Norfolk; Elmer, West Sussex; Brixham, Devon, South Gare
United States – Long Beach, California; Santa Monica, California; Winthrop Beach, Massachusetts; Colonial Beach, Virginia
Japan – Central Breakwater in Tokyo; Ishizaki (檜山石崎郵便局), Hokkaido Prefecture; Kaike, Tottori Prefecture
India – Offshore Breakwater at Udangudi for captive coal jetty; Breakwater at BombaysMarine Drive. 
UAE - Dubai Palm Islands; Abu Dhabi Corniche
Hong Kong – Kai Tak and Chep Lap Kok Airports
Kuwait - Sabah Al Ahmad Sea City

See also
 Seawall
 Mole (architecture)
 Groyne
 Phoenix breakwater
 Mulberry harbour
 Hudson's equation
 Powell River Giant Hulks breakwater
 Phoenix breakwaters
 Port

References

 USACE (1984) – Shore protection manual (Volume I and II)
 N.W.H. Allsop (2002) – Breakwaters, coastal structures and coastlines.

External links

USGS Oblique Aerial Photography — Coastal Erosion from El-Niño Winter Storms October, 1997 & April, 1998
Channel Coastal Observatory — Breakwaters Gallery
Shapes of breakwater armour units and year of their introduction
 SeaBull Marine, Inc. — Shoreline Erosion Reversal Systems
WaveBrake – Wave attenuation specialists
IAS Breakwater in Facebook

 
Coastal engineering
Coastal construction